is a JR West Geibi Line station located in Shimo Shiwachi-chō, Miyoshi, Hiroshima Prefecture, Japan. This station should not be confused with other stations of similar-sounding name on the Geibi Line: Shimowachi, Shiomachi, and Shiwaguchi.

History
1915-04-28: Shiwachi Station opens
1987-04-01: Japan National Railways is privatized, and Shiwachi Station becomes a JR West station

Station building and platforms
Shiwachi Station features one raised island platform, capable of handling two lines simultaneously. The station building is an old wooden building with a tile roof. Tickets can be purchased at a shop in front of the station.

Environs
Kawachi Post Office
Miyoshi Municipal Aogawa Elementary
Miyoshi Municipal Awaya Nishi Elementary
Gōno River
Gōno River Parking Area (Chūgoku Expressway, no access)

Highway access
Japan National Route 54
 Hiroshima Prefectural Route 37 (Hiroshima-Miyoshi Route)
 Hiroshima Prefectural Route 63 (Miyoshi-Miwa Route)
 Hiroshima Prefectural Route 227 (Shiwachi Teishajō Route)

Connecting lines
All lines are JR West lines. 
Geibi Line
Nishi Miyoshi Station — Shiwachi Station — Kamikawatachi Station

References

External links
 JR West

Geibi Line
Railway stations in Hiroshima Prefecture
Railway stations in Japan opened in 1915